Andreas Ottensamer (born 4 April 1989) is an Austrian clarinettist and is one of the solo clarinettists of the Berlin Philharmonic.

Life 
Born in Vienna, Ottensamer commenced his musical studies in 1999 at the University of Music and Performing Arts Vienna on piano and then on violoncello with Wolfgang Herzer and then from 2003 clarinet with Johann Hindler. Ottensamer also enrolled as a student at Harvard University in the United States. Ottensamer first gained his orchestral experience as substitute clarinet in the Vienna State Opera and the Vienna Philharmonic and is a former member of the Gustav Mahler Youth Orchestra. In October 2009, he was a fellow of the Orchestra Academy of the Berlin Philharmonic. From July 2010 to February 2011, he was solo clarinettist of the German Symphony Orchestra, Berlin and since March 2011 he fills the position of solo clarinet with the Berlin Philharmonic.

First prize winner of several competitions on clarinet, piano and cello, Ottensamer has performed as soloist and chamber musician worldwide with partners such as the Vienna Virtuosi (members of the Vienna Philharmonic), the Vienna Chamber Orchestra and performers including Leif Ove Andsnes, Angelika Kirchschlager, Julian Rachlin and Yo-Yo Ma. In 2005, together with father Ernst Ottensamer and his older brother Daniel Ottensamer (both solo clarinettists of the Vienna Philharmonic), formed the clarinet trio The Clarinotts. The ensemble gives concert tours in Austria, Germany, Italy, Japan, the United States, performs at festivals all over the world, appeared on TV and radio and in 1999 recorded a CD published by Gramola Vienna and Octavia Records.

Ottensamer accompanied Tori Amos on her 2011 album Night of Hunters.

In 2013 Ottensamer entered an exclusive recording agreement with Universal Classics's Mercury Classics label, in partnership with Deutsche Grammophon (DG). This makes him the first clarinettist to release exclusively through DG. His debut album, Portraits – The Clarinet Album, was released in June 2013 internationally through Mercury Classics/Deutsche Grammophon and features concertos by Domenico Cimarosa, George Gershwin and Aaron Copland, recorded with the Rotterdam Philharmonic Orchestra and Yannick Nézet-Séguin.

References

External links 
 
 Brucknerhaus – Andreas Ottensamer (in German)
 Gramola Vienna: The Clarinotts (in German)
 Website of The Clarinotts (in German)
 Interview with The Clarinotts (in German)

1989 births
Austrian classical clarinetists
Austrian classical musicians
Living people
Musicians from Vienna
Players of the Berlin Philharmonic
21st-century clarinetists